66 Ophiuchi is a binary variable star in the equatorial constellation of Ophiuchus. It has the variable star designation V2048 Ophiuchi, while 66 Ophiuchi is the Flamsteed designation. This object is visible to the naked eye as a faint, blue-white hued point of light with a baseline apparent visual magnitude of 4.60. It is located approximately 650 light years away from the Sun based on parallax, but is drifting closer with a radial velocity of −13 km/s. The star has a peculiar velocity of  relative to its neighbors.

The primary star, known as 66 Ophiuchi A, is a main sequence Be star with a stellar classification of B2Ve. Like many other Be stars, it is a γ Cas variable; a shell star with a circumstellar disc of gas and is exhibiting irregular changes in brightness, ranging from 4.85 up to 4.55 magnitude. The star is 14 million years old with 9.6 times the Sun's mass and is spinning rapidly with a projected rotational velocity of 250 km/s. It is radiating 1,525 times the Sun's luminosity from its photosphere at an effective temperature of 22,000 K. Because of its rotation, it has a polar equatorial radius 4.50 that of the Sun, but an equatorial radius 5.11 that of the Sun.

A magnitude 6.5 visual companion at an angular separation of  has been reported, and is known as 66 Ophiuchi B. It is 2.61 magnitudes fainter than the primary. This corresponds to a mass of about 3.8 times that of the Sun, and a spectral class of about B8.

References

B-type main-sequence stars
Gamma Cassiopeiae variable stars
Ophiuchi, V2048
Binary stars

Ophiuchus (constellation)
BD+04 3570
Ophiuchi, 66
164284
088149
6712